Naanga Romba Busy is a 2020 Indian Tamil-language crime comedy film directed by  Badri. It is a remake of the Kannada film Mayabazar 2016 (2020)  and stars Prasanna, Shaam, Ashwin Kakumanu, Yogi Babu, Shruti Marathe, Rittika Sen, and VTV Ganesh. The film was premiered as a Diwali special on Sun TV on 14 November 2020.

Plot 
Kuberan, a small-time crook, needs money to escape from police. Kumaravel is an honest police officer whose wife Sangeetha suffers from thyroid cancer, but he has no money to save her. Karthik is a poor carpenter who falls in love with rich girl Meera and also needs money to marry her.

During the time of demonetization 2016, Kumaravel hatches a plan who works in IB, using Kuberan, to conduct fake IT raids on the black money holders, and the plan succeeds. Kumaravel asks Kuberan to stop the raids, but the situation becomes critical when Sangeetha needs more treatment to cure her cancer. Kumaravel agrees to raid one last time, and Kuberan raids a house, gets crores in old currency and finds Karthik in the house owner's bedroom, but on Karthik's request, Kuberan agrees not to tell anyone about Karthik. Kuberan argues with Kumaravel about the raid, and Karthik discovers that the raid was fake and asks for a share in the money.

The money actually belongs to corrupt officer ACP Ravichandran. He learns that the raid was fake and begins to investigate. Kumaravel tells that the CBI raids everywhere were to exchange old notes to new, and everyone is in urgent need of money, so he plans to steal in the house of notorious corporate Oorandai Govindan's, but the plan fails. Karthik leaves the group for the sake of his future child. Kumaravel goes back to an honest living and surrenders the money to Ravichandran. Kuberan raids Govindan's house with a new team and gets 15 crore new currency notes while dealing with Govindan. Ravichandran arrests Kuberan and takes the whole black money himself. However, Kuberan captures the whole thing in a secret camera. Finally, Ravichandran releases Kuberan and also gives a share in the money. Also, Sangeetha gets aid from a foundation for treatment. Karthik also marries Meera, who also gets a share in the money which Kuberan got. Kumaravel serves the duty with honesty, Karthik, his wife and Kuberan goes to Bangkok and settle there.

Cast

Production 
In early November 2020, the media reported that Sundar C. had bought the remake rights of the demonetisation thriller Mayabazar 2016 (2020). The film was launched on 14 September 2020 and is based on the 2016 Indian banknote demonetisation. He produced the film under his banner Avni Movies. The film is directed by Badri who previously worked with Sundar C. as a dialogue writer for Kalakalappu (2012) and Action (2019). Prasanna and Shaam were cast as police officers while Ashwin Kakumanu and Yogi Babu were signed to portray a youngster and thief, respectively. Raiza Wilson was reported by the media as being a part of the film; however, this later proved to be false. Shruti Marathe, who starred in Guru Sishyan (2010), was cast as the female lead opposite Prasanna and this film marks her return to Tamil cinema. Rittika Sen, who was last seen in Dagaalty (2020), was cast as the female lead opposite Kakumanu. The film was shot in Chennai in twenty-six days during the COVID-19 pandemic. The title was later revealed to be Naanga Romba Busy. Prasanna later revealed that the inspiration for the title came after he said Naa Romba Busy on his birthday.

Soundtrack 
The songs are composed by C. Sathya.
Theera Karai - Diwakar
Adalu Amta Seenu - Gana Sallu, Diwakar, Ranina Reddy
Raathiri - Chinmayi, Sathyaprakash

Release 
The film was telecasted as Diwali direct television premiere via Sun TV on 14 November 2020. A critic from The Times of India said that "This demonetisation comedy often lacks spunk". A critic from The New Indian Express wrote that "This remake manages to not just do justice to the original but also efficiently cater to the local audience". A critic from Behindwoods called the film a "decent family entertainer".

References 

2020 comedy films
2020 films
2020 television films
Films about kidnapping in India
Films shot in Chennai
Indian crime comedy films
Indian heist films
Indian nonlinear narrative films
Indian television films
2020s masala films
Tamil remakes of Kannada films
2020s Tamil-language films
2020 crime films
2020s crime comedy films